The LET Access Series (LETAS) is a professional golf tour for women and the official development tour to the Ladies European Tour.

Launched in 2010, the LET Access Series provides players with an opportunity to compete and progress on to the LET. Eligible for membership are all female professional golfers and amateurs over 18 with a handicap of 2 or better.

Women's World Golf Rankings
As one of the eight major women's tours (along with LPGA, JLPGA, KLPGA, LET, ALPG, Symetra Tour and China LPGA Tour) performances on LETAS carry Women's World Golf Rankings points.

Seasons and results

Past tour schedules
By 2014 over 250 professionals and 200 amateurs competed. The season consisted of 16 tournaments in 12 countries with prize funds of €30,000 – €50,000, and saw 11 winners from 8 countries. In 2020, a number of tournaments were postponed or cancelled due to the COVID-19 pandemic.

Source:

Order of Merit and Award winners
The top six players on the LETAS Order of Merit earn LET membership for the Ladies European Tour. Players finishing in positions 7–20 get to skip the first stage of the qualifying event and automatically progress to the final stage of the Lalla Aicha Tour School.

Source:

Multiple winners
Winners of three or more LETAS events, ordered chronologically.

See also
Ladies European Tour
Epson Tour

References

External links

Ladies European Tour
LET Access Series
Professional golf tours
Women's golf
Golf in Europe
Sports leagues established in 2010
2010 establishments in Europe